The Château d'Urendorf is a château in the commune of Ernolsheim-Bruche, Bas-Rhin, Alsace, France.

The oldest parts of the building (three towers and the main residential block) date from the 3rd quarter of the 16th century. It was registered as a monument historique in 1936.

References

Châteaux in Bas-Rhin
Monuments historiques of Bas-Rhin